The Arizona State Sun Devils women's basketball team represents Arizona State University in women's basketball. The school competes in the Pac-12 Conference in Division I of the National Collegiate Athletic Association (NCAA). The Sun Devils play at Desert Financial Arena in Tempe, Arizona near the campus.

Season-by-season record
As of the end of the 2016–17 season, the Sun Devils have a 670–475 all-time record. They have reached the NCAA Tournament 17 times, with 12 of those occurring since 2000. They finished as NWIT runner up in 1981.

Postseason Appearances

NCAA Division I Tournament Results

The Sun Devils have been in 17 NCAA Tournaments. Their record is 21–17.

WNIT Appearances

The Sun Devils have been in 6 WNIT Tournaments. Their record is 3-7.

Notable players

Retired jerseys

WNBA Players
Briann January, Connecticut Sun

WNBL
Joy Burke, Bendigo Spirit

References

External links